In theoretical network science, the Turing switch is a logical construction modeling the operation of the network switch, just as in theoretical computer science a Turing machine models the operation of a computer. Both are named in honor of the English logician Alan Turing, although the research in Turing switches is not based on Turing's research. Some introductory research on the Turing switch was started at the University of Cambridge by Jon Crowcroft (Homepage).

In essence, Crowcroft suggests that instead of using general-purpose computers to do packet switching, the required operations should be reduced to application specific logic and then that application specific logic should be implemented using optical components. The work is not actually based on Turing's research.

A Turing switch consists of a switched fabric, one or more ingress interfaces (also referred to as sources), one or more egress interfaces (sinks), and a decision procedure to determine an egress interface given an ingress interface. Interfaces are sometimes referred to as ports. A packet (cell or switched unit) arrives at an ingress interface, the appropriate egress interface is determined by the decision procedure, and the packet is then transported across the switching fabric to the egress interface. A packet is a symbol or sequence of 1's and 0's. An ingress interface is connected to an ingress line and an egress interface to an egress line. The ingress line is said to feed the ingress interface; the egress interface feeds the egress line.

See also 
Network switch
Software-defined networking

References

Telecommunications
Telecommunications systems
Routers (computing)
Turing machine